The agencies of the Government of Victoria in Australia are collectively described as the Victorian public sector. By convention, and similarly to other jurisdictions with Westminster systems of government, the public sector is organised into the public service and public entities. The public sector is also collectively known as the machinery of government. In Victoria, the public sector is defined by the Public Administration Act 2004.

The Victorian public service is composed of ten departments, the head of each being a secretary. Each department can consist of a number of portfolios, each of which is the direct responsibility of a minister, who collectively form the ministry. A number of other bodies perform specific roles within the public service. For example, the Victorian Public Sector Commission oversees and reports on the public sector as a whole; Administrative Offices established in relation to departments and undertake clearly defined tasks while reporting directly to the secretary and the responsible Minister; and various other bodies which are described in legislation as public service employers.

Public entities are formed in various ways: they may be statutory authorities, formed by legislative instruments which define their role and purpose; state-owned enterprises with a commercial purpose; or other advisory bodies performing a public function. Public entities are granted varying degrees of autonomy but are ultimately responsible to the relevant minister. For that purpose, each is assigned to the portfolio of the department supporting the minister. Departments, therefore, are responsible for both the public service bodies and public entities which fall within their purview.

Transfers of responsibility between public sector bodies, and the creation or abolition of these bodies, are known as machinery of government changes. The Public Administration Act provides the mechanisms by which such changes are made.

Education
Department of Education

Public entities 
AMES Australia
Bendigo Kangan Institute
Box Hill Institute
Centre for Adult Education
Chisholm Institute
Federation Training Institute
Gordon Institute of TAFE
Goulburn Ovens Institute of TAFE
Holmesglen Institute
Melbourne Polytechnic
South West Institute of TAFE
Sunraysia Institute of TAFE
VET Development Centre
Victorian Institute of Teaching
William Angliss Institute of TAFE
Wodonga Institute of TAFE
The over 1,500 councils of schools in the state school system are considered individual public entities responsible to the department. Similarly, permanent and casual relief teachers in state schools are employed by the Teaching Service, which although a component of the department is not a public service employer.

Energy, Environment and Climate Action 
Department of Energy, Environment and Climate Action

Public service 
Sustainability Victoria
Office of the Commissioner for Environmental Sustainability

Public entities 
Architects Registration Board of Victoria
Development Victoria
Energy Safe Victoria
Environment Protection Authority
Game Management Authority
Parks Victoria
Phillip Island Nature Park Board of Management
Royal Botanic Gardens Board
Trust for Nature (Victoria)
Victorian Building Authority
Victorian Environmental Assessment Council
Victorian Environmental Water Holder
Victorian Planning Authority
Winton Wetlands Committee of Management
Working Heritage Incorporated
Zoological Parks and Gardens Board
Alpine resort boards
Falls Creek Alpine Resort Management Board
Mount Buller and Mount Stirling Alpine Resort Management Board
Mount Hotham Alpine Resort Management Board
Southern Alpine Resort Management Board
Catchment management authorities
Corangamite Catchment Management Authority
East Gippsland Catchment Management Authority
Glenelg Hopkins Catchment Management Authority
Goulburn Broken Catchment Management Authority
Mallee Catchment Management Authority
North Central Catchment Management Authority
North East Catchment Management Authority
Port Phillip and Westernport Catchment Management Authority
West Gippsland Catchment Management Authority
Wimmera Catchment Management Authority
Coastal management committees
Barwon Coast Committee of Management
Bellarine Bayside Foreshore Committee of Management Inc
Capel Sound Foreshore Committee of Management Inc
Great Ocean Road Coast Committee Inc
Point Leo Foreshore and Public Parks Reserves Committee of Management Inc
Water corporations
Barwon Water
Central Gippsland Region Water Corporation
Central Highlands Region Water Corporation
City West Water Corporation
Coliban Region Water Corporation
East Gippsland Region Water Corporation
Gippsland & Southern Rural Water Corporation
Goulburn Valley Region Water Corporation
Goulburn–Murray Rural Water Corporation
Grampians Wimmera Mallee Water Corporation
Lower Murray Urban and Rural Water Corporation
Melbourne Water Corporation
North East Region Water Corporation
South East Water Corporation
South Gippsland Region Water Corporation
Wannon Region Water Corporation
Western Region Water Corporation
Westernport Region Water Corporation
Yarra Valley Water Corporation
Waste management groups
Barwon South West Waste and Resource Recovery Group
Gippsland Waste and Resource Recovery Group
Goulburn Valley Waste and Resource Recovery Group
Grampians Central West Waste and Resource Recovery Group
Loddon Mallee Waste and Resource Recovery Group
Metropolitan Waste and Resource Recovery Group
North East Waste and Resource Recovery Group

Families, Fairness and Housing 
Department of Families, Fairness and Housing

Public service 
Commission for Children and Young People
Family Safety Victoria
Safer Care Victoria

Public entities

Health 
Department of Health

Public service 
Victorian Agency for Health Information

Public entities 
All public hospitals in Victoria are operated by boards responsible to the Department of Health. For a list of hospitals, see 
Ambulance Victoria
Ballaarat General Cemeteries Trust
BreastScreen Victoria
Geelong Cemeteries Trust
Greater Metropolitan Cemeteries Trust
Health Purchasing Victoria
Kardinia Park Stadium Trust
Melbourne and Olympic Parks Trust
Remembrance Park Central Victoria
Southern Metropolitan Cemeteries Trust
State Sport Centres Trust
Victorian Assisted Reproductive Treatment Authority
Victorian Health Promotion Foundation (VicHealth)
Victorian Institute of Forensic Mental Health
Victorian Institute of Sport
Victorian Pharmacy Authority

Government Services
Department of Government Services

Jobs, Skills, Industry and Regions 
Department of Jobs, Skills, Industry and Regions

Public entities 
Agriculture Victoria Services Pty Ltd
Australian Centre for the Moving Image
Australian Grand Prix Corporation
Dairy Food Safety Victoria
Docklands Studios Melbourne
Emerald Tourist Railway Board
Federation Square Pty Ltd
Film Victoria
Geelong Performing Arts Centre Trust
Greater Sunraysia Pest Free Area Industry Development Committee
Launch Victoria
Melbourne Convention Bureau
Melbourne Convention & Exhibition Trust
Melbourne Market Authority
Melbourne Recital Centre
Museum Victoria
National Gallery of Victoria
PrimeSafe
State Library of Victoria
The Wheeler Centre
Veterinary Practitioners Registration Board
VicForests
Victorian Arts Centre Trust
Visit Victoria

Justice and Community Safety 
Department of Justice and Community Safety

Public service 
Births, Deaths and Marriages (Victorian Registry of)
Court Services Victoria
Office of Public Prosecutions
Office of the Legal Services Commissioner
Office of the Road Safety Camera Commissioner
Victoria Police (support staff only)
Victorian Commission for Gambling and Liquor Regulation
Victorian Equal Opportunity and Human Rights Commission (excluding Commissioner)
Victorian Government Solicitor's Office
Victorian Responsible Gambling Foundation excluding CEO)

Public entities 
Consumer Policy Research Centre
Country Fire Authority
Emergency Services Telecommunications Authority
Fire Rescue Victoria
Greyhound Racing Victoria
Harness Racing Victoria
Victoria Law Foundation
Victoria Legal Aid
Victoria Police (sworn police and protective services officers)
Victoria State Emergency Service

Premier and Cabinet 
Department of Premier and Cabinet

Public service 
Independent Broad-based Anti-corruption Commission
Infrastructure Victoria
Latrobe Valley Authority
Local Government Investigations and Compliance Inspectorate
Office of the Chief Parliamentary Counsel
Office of the Commissioner for Privacy and Data Protection
Office of the Freedom of Information Commissioner
Office of the Governor
Office of the Ombudsman Victoria
Office of the Victorian Inspectorate
Office of the Victorian Electoral Commissioner
Office of the Victorian Government Architect
Public Record Office Victoria
Victorian Public Sector Commission

Public entities 
Queen Victoria Women's Centre Trust
Shrine of Remembrance Trust
VITS LanguageLink

Treasury and Finance 
Department of Treasury and Finance

Public service 
CenITex
Commission for Better Regulation
Emergency Services and State Super
Essential Services Commission
Office of Projects Victoria
State Revenue Office

Public entities 
Old Treasury Building Reserve Committee of Management
State Electricity Commission of Victoria
State Trustees Limited
Transport Accident Commission
Treasury Corporation of Victoria
Victorian Asbestos Eradication Agency
Victorian Funds Management Corporation
Victorian Managed Insurance Authority
Victorian WorkCover Authority (WorkSafe)

Transport and Planning 
Department of Transport and Planning

Public service 
Chief Investigator, Transport Safety
Director, Transport Safety (Transport Safety Victoria)
Major Transport Infrastructure Authority
Level Crossing Removal Project
Major Road Projects Victoria
North East Link Project
Rail Projects Victoria
West Gate Tunnel Project
Transport for Victoria

Public entities 
Gippsland Ports
Port of Hastings Development Authority
Responsible to Department of Transport:
Commercial Passenger Vehicles Victoria
Public Transport Victoria
VicRoads
Victorian Ports Corporation (Melbourne)
Victorian Regional Channels Authority
V/Line
Victorian Fisheries Authority
VicTrack

Non-executive agencies 
A small number of agencies are constitutionally or statutorily independent of the government and are directly responsible to the Parliament of Victoria and its officers.
Victorian Auditor-General's Office
Parliamentary Budget Office of Victoria
Parliamentary departments
Department of Parliamentary Services
Department of the Legislative Council
Department of the Legislative Assembly

References 

Victoria
Government agencies

simple:Government of Victoria